Erkrath station is a through station in the town of Erkrath in the German state of North Rhine-Westphalia. It has two platform tracks and it is classified by Deutsche Bahn as a category 5 station.

History

The station was opened along with the Düsseldorf–Elberfeld railway from Düsseldorf to Erkrath by the Düsseldorf-Elberfeld Railway Company on 20 December 1838. The line between Erkrath and Hochdahl has a gradient of 3.33% and rises 82 m in about 2.5 km. For more than one hundred years, this was the steepest main line in Europe. For many years trains had to be hauled by cable, originally driven by a stationary steam engine. A few months later haulage by cable attached to a stationary steam engine was changed to haulage by cable attached via pulleys to a locomotive running downhill on an additional track. With the duplication of the remainder of the line in 1865, the steep section of line became three-track, until the electrification of the line in 1963. The third track was rebuilt in 1985, as part of the additional third track built for the planned S-Bahn line.  In 1926, cable haulage on the incline was replaced by bank engines.

Services
The station is served by the Rhine-Ruhr S-Bahn lines S 8 between Mönchengladbach and Wuppertal-Oberbarmen or Hagen every 20 minutes and several S 68 services between Wuppertal-Vohwinkel and Langenfeld in the peak hour.

It is also served by four bus routes operated by Rheinbahn: O5 (every 20–60 minutes), O6 (20), 734 (60) and 743 (60).

References

Rhine-Ruhr S-Bahn stations
S8 (Rhine-Ruhr S-Bahn)
S68 (Rhine-Ruhr S-Bahn)
Railway stations in Germany opened in 1838
1838 establishments in Prussia
Buildings and structures in Mettmann (district)